Fuenlabrada de los Montes is a municipality in the province of Badajoz, Extremadura, Spain. It has a population of 2,046 and an area of 192 km².

References

Municipalities in the Province of Badajoz